USS Lang may refer to the following ships of the United States Navy:

  was a destroyer, commissioned in 1939 and decommissioned in 1946.
  was a destroyer escort, commissioned in 1971 and decommissioned in 1991.

United States Navy ship names